Issues in Science and Technology Librarianship is a quarterly peer-reviewed open access academic journal covering issues of interest to science and technology librarians. It was established in 1991 and the editor-in-chief is Andrea L. Duda (University of California, Santa Barbara).

Abstracting and indexing
The journal is abstracted and indexed in Inspec, Library and Information Science Abstracts, ProQuest databases, and Scopus.

References

External links

Library science journals
Creative Commons-licensed journals
Quarterly journals
Publications established in 1991
English-language journals